Hilton Garden Inn is an American chain of mid-priced, limited or focused service hotels owned by Hilton Worldwide. As of December 31, 2019, it has 862 properties with 126,086 rooms in 49 countries and territories, including 81 that are managed with 15,678 rooms and 781 that are franchised with 110,408 rooms.

History

The Hilton Garden Inn brand began in the late 1980s under the name CrestHill by Hilton. Due to a slow real estate phase, only four of 25 proposed hotels were built. Of these four original hotels, three are still part of the chain today. They are located in Lancaster, Pennsylvania, Southfield, Michigan, and Valencia, California. The other hotel, located in Buffalo Grove, Illinois, is now a Four Points. The brand was reintroduced in 1990 as Hilton Garden Inn and has grown from four hotels to more than 860 limited or select service properties in about 25 years.

In 2012, the first Hilton Garden Inn outside of  North America was opened in Netherlands—the Hilton Garden Inn Leiden. It is located on the Old Rhine River, featuring 173 guestrooms and providing all of the brand's signature features.

Future developments
The Hilton Garden Inn brand plans to open properties in Albania, Argentina, Armenia, Busselton, Faroe Islands, Hong Kong, Saudi Arabia, Thailand, Turkey, India, Kenya, Ireland, and additional locations throughout the United States, Canada, UK, Italy, Germany, Romania, Namibia, Colombia, Panama, Costa Rica, and Poland.

Hilton Garden Inn announced the opening of one of its hotels in the port city of Santa Marta, Colombia, by 2016.

References

External links
 
 Hilton Garden Inn Media Center

Garden Inn
Hotels established in 1996